These quarterbacks have started at least one game for the San Francisco 49ers of the National Football League. They are listed in order of the date of each player's first start at quarterback for the 49ers.

Starting quarterbacks

The number of games they started during the season is listed to the right in parentheses.

Regular season

Postseason

In the NFL era (since 1950 season)

Most games as starting quarterback
These quarterbacks have the most starts for the 49ers in regular season games in the NFL era (since 1950 season).

Team career passing records

In the NFL era (since 1950 season)

See also
 Lists of NFL starting quarterbacks

San Francisco 49ers

quarterbacks